Devbhumi Dwarka District is a district of India located on the southern coast of the Gulf of Kutch in the state of Gujarat. Its headquarters are located in the city of Jamkhambhaliya. The district was created on 15 August 2013 from Jamnagar district.

Talukas (Administrative Divisions) 
The district consists of 4 talukas:
 Dwarka (Okhamandal)
 Bhanvad
 Kalyanpur
 Khambhalia (Jamkhambhaliya)

Demographics

The divided district had a population of 752,484, of which 241,795 (32.13%) lived in urban areas. The residual district had a sex ratio of 947 females per 1000 males. Scheduled Castes and Scheduled Tribes made up 50,937 (6.77%) and 9,687 (1.29%) of the population respectively.

Religion

Hindus were 636,991 (84.65%) while Muslims were 112,894 (15.00%).

Language

At the time of the 2011 census, 88.12% of the population spoke Gujarati, 9.35% Kachchhi and 1.63% Hindi as their first language.

Politics
  

|}

Villages 
 

Mota Gunda

References

External links
Official website

Districts of Gujarat
2013 establishments in Gujarat